2H or 2-H may refer to:

Deuterium, or 2H, an isotope of hydrogen
2nd half of a fiscal year
2H lead, a type of lead in a pencil
2H, a type of Toyota H engine
2H, a type of Volkswagen EA827 engine
Douglas O-2H, a model of Douglas O-2
Chaparral 2H, one model of Chaparral Cars
Aptera 2h, a model in the Aptera 2 Series
SSH 2H (WA), alternate designation for Washington State Route 290
2H, a designation for chemicals with two hydrogen molecules
2H-pyran, a form of Pyran
2H-1-benzopyran, a form of Benzopyran
2H-pyran-2-one, a form of 2-Pyrone

See also
H2 (disambiguation)